Palo Verde Valley Transit Agency is a public transportation operator in Riverside County, California, United States. Palo Verde Valley Transit operates in the eastern portion of Riverside county, with the focus city of Blythe

History
In 2009, PVVTA was fined by the California Air Resources Board for failure to comply with the boards fleet rule of exceeding Particulate matter emission total. As well as for failure to submit an annual report on time.

Services

Fixed route
The fixed-route services currently consists of 6 local deviated fixed routes operating as the Desert Roadrunner

Routes

Demand response

TRIP and Mobility Management ADA Service
TRIP provides public transportation services for persons who are outside the areas served by the Desert Roadrunner deviated fixed route service. It is aimed at seniors, over the age of 60, with disabilities, and those living in Desert Center or in Southern Palo Verde Valley.

Mobility Management, is a ADA service for physically or cognitively unable to use regular bus service. Mobility Management operates curb to- curb service with minibuses or vans, complementing the Desert Roadrunner fixed-route bus system.

References

External links

Bus transportation in California
Public transportation in Riverside County, California
Transit agencies in California